In ecology, urban ecosystems are considered a ecosystem functional group within the intensive land-use biome. They are structurally complex ecosystems with highly heterogeneous and dynamic spatial structure that is created and maintained by humans. They include cities, smaller settlements and industrial areas, that are made up of diverse patch types (e.g. buildings, paved surfaces, transport infrastructure, parks and gardens, refuse areas). Urban ecosystems rely on large subsidies of imported water, nutrients, food and other resources. Compared to other natural and artificial ecosystems human population density is high, and their interaction with the different patch types produces emergent properties and complex feedbacks among ecosystem components.

In socioecology, urban areas are considered part of a broader social-ecological system in which urban landscapes and urban human communities interact with other landscape elements. Urbanization has large impacts on human and environmental health, and the study of urban ecosystems has led to proposals for sustainable urban designs and approaches to development of city fringe areas that can help reduce negative impact on surrounding environments and promote human well-being.

Bibliography

Manfredi Nicoletti, L'Ecosistema Urbano (The Urban Ecosystem), Dedalo Bari 1978

See also 
 Ecosystem
 Human ecosystem
 Media ecosystem
 Urban planning
 Urban ecology

References

Ecosystems
Systems ecology